The National Debt Clock is a billboard-sized running total display that shows the United States gross national debt and each American family's share of the debt.  , it is installed on the western side of One Bryant Park, west of Sixth Avenue between 42nd and 43rd Streets in Manhattan, New York City. It was the first debt clock installed anywhere.

The clock's first incarnation was installed in 1989 on Sixth Avenue between 42nd and 43rd Streets, one block away from Times Square, by New York real estate developer Seymour Durst, who wanted to highlight the rising national debt. In 2004, the clock was dismantled and a new one installed near 44th Street and Sixth Avenue. In 2008, the U.S. national debt exceeded $10 trillion, one more digit than the clock could display. The lit dollar-sign in the clock's leftmost digit position was later changed to the "1" digit to represent the ten-trillionth place. In 2017, the clock was moved to One Bryant Park, near the original location.

Context
Durst said in 2006 that the clock was a non-partisan effort to think about intergenerational equity: "We're a family business. We think generationally, and we don't want to see the next generation crippled by this burden."

Seymour's son Douglas said his father had been toying with the basic idea of drawing attention to the growing national debt since at least 1980, when during the holiday season he sent cards to senators and congressmen that said "Happy New Year. Your share of the national debt is $35,000". In the early 1980s, when Seymour first developed the idea of a constantly updated clock, the technology required to implement the project was not yet available. Back then, the debt was quickly approaching $1 trillion.

First clock

The first National Debt Clock was installed on February 20, 1989. The national debt stood at  that year. The original  clock was constructed at a cost of $100,000. It cost $500 per month to maintain the display's 305 lightbulbs. It was mounted on a now-demolished Durst building at Sixth Avenue near 42nd Street (a block from Times Square), facing the north side of 42nd Street and Bryant Park. Built by the New York sign company Artkraft Strauss, the clock featured a dot-based segment display emulating the then-typical character resolution of 5-by-7. Similar to the second clock, the updating mechanism was such that the display was set to the estimated speed of debt growth (odometer-style) and adjusted weekly according to the latest numbers published by the United States Treasury. Durst vowed that the clock would "be up as long as the debt or the city lasts," and that "if it bothers people, then it's working."

Up until the week before his death in May 1995, Durst himself adjusted the tally via modem. After his death, his son Douglas became president of the Durst Organization, which owns and maintains the clock. Artkraft Strauss has been keeping the figures current since then. On November 15, 1995, the clock stopped counting up for the first time in its six years of operation. As a result of a federal government shutdown, the clock was frozen at a value of $4,985,567,071,200. In 1998, the clock broke down shortly after the numbers surpassed $5.5 trillion. The cause was attributed to the numbers "being too high." In response, Artkraft installed a new computer inside the clock.

In early 2000, the clock started to run backward because the national debt was actually decreasing. It showed a national debt of $5.7 trillion and an individual family share of almost $74,000. With the original purpose of the clock being to highlight the rising debt, the reversal of the figures gave a mixed message, added to the fact that the display not being designed to properly run backward. In May 2000, it was reported that the clock was planned to be unplugged on September 7, 2000, what would have been Seymour Durst's 87th birthday. Douglas said that the decision to unplug the clock was made because "it was put up to focus attention on the increasing national debt, and it's served its purpose." In September, the clock was unplugged and covered with a red-white-and-blue curtain, with the national debt standing at roughly 5.7 trillion dollars. However, less than two years later in July 2002, the curtain was raised and the clock once again picked up tracking a rising debt, starting at 6.1 trillion dollars.

Second clock

In 2004, the original clock was moved from its location near 42nd Street, and the building where the sign had been mounted was demolished so One Bryant Park could be built. An updated model was installed one block away on the side of a Durst building at 1133 Avenue of the Americas, facing Sixth Avenue near the southeast corner of the intersection with West 44th Street. The new clock is located next to an Internal Revenue Service office. The new clock, which can run backward, is outfitted with a brighter seven-segment display with multiple LEDs per segment, allowing the numbers to be read more easily.

Amid extensive media attention during the financial crisis beginning in 2007, the National Debt Clock's display ran out of digits when the U.S. gross federal debt rose above  on September 30, 2008. In the farthest-left space, the debt clock displayed the digit "1" in place of the dollar sign.

An overhaul or complete replacement adding two more digits to the clock's display was being planned . The clock would be able to show a debt of up to $1 quadrillion.

, Douglas Durst's cousin Jonathan "Jody" Durst, with whom he currently shares a co-presidency of the company, is in the process of taking over the day-to-day operations as president. In an interview with The New York Times, Jonathan said that maintenance of the clock is planned "for years to come."

In June 2017, the Durst Organization announced that the National Debt Clock would be moved again so that a new entrance for 1133 Avenue of the Americas could be built. The clock was moved to the western side of One Bryant Park, facing an alley in the middle of the block between Sixth Avenue and Broadway.

Similar projects

The idea of conveying a message through a periodically updated clock found an earlier expression in the Doomsday Clock. However, the innovation of the National Debt Clock was to feature a constantly running counter; it has since inspired similar projects elsewhere, both in the United States and further afield. In particular, it has become a national fixture shows that the U.S.'s increasing debt. By 1995, the New York Times reported that politicians were citing the clock to advocate for a reduction to the national budget. Various tracking counters of national debt are also kept online.

The National Debt Clock has also been credited as the inspiration behind other running totalizers, for example an AMD campaign employing an electronic billboard; instead of a debt, it tracked the supposed additional cost of using a rival chip. In 2010, a "death clock" parodying the debt clock was erected in Times Square, counting how many maternal deaths happen worldwide every 90 seconds.

Two displays related to the national debt were shown during the 2012 Republican National Convention. One of the displays showed a ticking number similar to the original clock. The second display showed a number estimating the amount the national debt had increased since the start of the convention. According to the Republican Party, the purpose of the RNC's clock was to underscore the fact that national debt had grown at a fast pace under the presidency of Barack Obama, who was then running for reelection. RNC chair Reince Priebus stated that the clock represented the "unprecedented fiscal recklessness of the Obama administration."

In popular culture
The clock is featured in the 2006 documentary Maxed Out, which is about national debt. Several members of the Durst family appear in the film.

See also
Government debt
United States public debt
History of the U.S. public debt
National wealth
Trump Death Clock

Notes

References

External links

1989 establishments in New York City
Buildings and structures in Manhattan
Economy of the United States
Government finances in the United States
Individual signs in the United States
National debt of the United States